Baker County High School is located in Glen St. Mary, Florida in Baker County, Florida, United States. It is part of the Baker County School District. The school's teams are known as the Wildcats.

References

External links

Educational institutions in the United States with year of establishment missing
High schools in Baker County, Florida
Public high schools in Florida